The first Fiji expedition undertaken by the United States occurred in October 1855 during the civil war on the islands. In response to the alleged arson attacks on the American commercial agent in Lautoka, Viti Levu, the navy sent a warship to demand compensation for the attack from Seru Epenisa Cakobau, the Vunivalu of Bau and self-proclaimed Tui Viti (King of Fiji).

Expedition
The first incident that led to the American expedition was in 1849 when the house owned by agent John Brown Williams was hit by cannon fire and burned. The second incident happened the same year as the expedition when, again, fire was to interrupt John Williams's duties. After another accidental fire on Nukulau destroyed his store and some Fijians looted it. , under Commander Edward B. Boutwell, was sent to monitor the unrest in October and her crew were landed on more than one occasion to protect American interests. When Commander Boutwell heard of the incidents involving William's house and store, he demanded US$5,000 in compensation from King Cakobau. This initial claim was supplemented by further claims totalling $45,000. The natives received a deadline saying if they failed to pay, a landing party of marines and sailors would be sent ashore to capture the king in the island's village. Fijian warriors put up some resistance and one American service man was killed and two were wounded. Ultimately the men of John Adams were successful in routing a contingent of natives from Lautoka but Cakobau and the survivors escaped capture.

Cakobau's claim to be King of Fiji was by no means universally recognised by his fellow-chiefs, who jealously guarded the independence of their fiefdoms. His dilemma was that if he acknowledged the debt, he did not have sufficient funds to pay it, but that if he disclaimed it by saying that it fell under the jurisdiction of another chief, he would jeopardize his claim to the kingship, which he wanted foreign powers to recognize. He decided to bide his time, hoping that the Americans were only bluffing.

References

Fiji expedition
1855 in the United States
1855 in Fiji
1855 in Oceania
Pacific Ocean
History of Fiji
United States Navy in the 19th century
Fiji expedition
Fiji
Fiji
Violence against indigenous peoples